Augustino Lyatonga Mrema (31 December 1944 – 21 August 2022) was a Tanzanian politician, who served as minister of home affairs from 1990 to 1995. After switching party affiliation in February 1995, he joined NCCR-Mageuzi before moving on to Tanzania Labour Party (TLP), where he was made the party chairman. He also served as the member of parliament for Vunjo constituency, on multiple occasions, until 2015, when he was defeated in the national election by James Mbatia of NCCR Mageuzi. In early 2016, Mrema was appointed a chairperson of the Tanzania Parole Board by the president, John Magufuli.

Mrema was a member of the Chaga tribe from Kiraracha village, near Mount Kilimanjaro. He was the second of five siblings.

Education
From 1955 until 1963, Mrema attended primary and secondary education at Moshi, thereafter joining St.Patrick Teachers training college also in Moshi where he finished his Secondary education in 1965. In 1968, Mrema sat for the Cambridge University O-level exams. He  joined the Kivukoni Political Education College, after which he was sent to Marangu for further training.

Government positions
Mrema has been in the Tanzanian government, National Security Organisation and in Chama Cha Mapinduzi (CCM) since 1966; he has held the following 5 positions as follows:

 Rural Civics Teacher 1974–1980
 Teacher at the National Security College 1980–1982
 Assistant Deputy for National Security in the Dodoma Region 1982–1984
 Chief Deputy for National Security in Dodoma Region 1983–1984
 Chief Deputy for National Security in Shinyanga Region 1985–1987

Political career
Even though Mrema has contested every presidential election in Tanzania since the country instituted a multiparty system in the early 1990s, his political career started in 1985 when he tried to run for MP in his home district of Kilimanjaro. His candidacy was blocked by the High Court, and in 1987 he was officially announced as the winner after a lengthy appeals process. He was able to retain his seat in 1990 without stiff competition. The fact that he was an MP enabled the president to appoint him to various cabinet positions. From 1990 to 1995, Mrema held various cabinet and high level government positions:

 Minister of Interior 1990–1994
 Minister of Labour, Development and Sports 1994–1995

Mrema left CCM in 1995 and joined a new political party National Convention for Construction and Reform-Mageuzi. In the first multiparty election in 1995, he ran on the ticket of the National Convention for Construction and Reform-Mageuzi (NCCR-Mageuzi), and won 27.77% of the vote. He finished third behind the then-incumbent president, Benjamin Mkapa, of Chama Cha Mapinduzi (CCM) and Ibrahim Lipumba of the Civic United Front (CUF), capturing 7.80% of the vote, this time on the ticket of the TLP. Running again as the TLP presidential candidate in the 2005 election, Mrema was fourth out of ten candidates, winning 0.75% of the vote. By this time he got presidential appointment as parole board chairperson from 2016 to 2019.

Death 
Mrema died in Muhimbili Hospital Dar es Salaam on 21 August 2022 06:15 am, at the age of 77.

References

External links
 Tanzania Election Candidates Profile (in Swahili)

1944 births
2022 deaths
Tanzanian socialists
Tanzania Labour Party politicians
Government ministers of Tanzania
Kivukoni College alumni
Members of the National Assembly (Tanzania)
People from Kilimanjaro Region